Robert Asquith Daykin (1 January 1881 – 4 June 1925) was an Australian rules footballer who played with South Melbourne in the Victorian Football League (VFL).

Notes

External links 

1881 births
1925 deaths
Australian rules footballers from Victoria (Australia)
Sydney Swans players
Golden Square Football Club players
South Bendigo Football Club players